Abrah Comfort Rosemond (July 16, 1960) is a female Ghanaian politician. She was the member of parliament for the Weija Gbawe Constituency.

Early life and education
She obtained an MPhil (guidance and counseling) from the University of Cape Coast in 2002.

Career
Comfort is also a trained educationist and was appointed district director of the Kwaebibirem District Office of the GES. She won the 2012 parliamentary elections with 32,861 votes representing 53.59% of the total votes cast.

Personal life
Comfort Rosemond is married with two children.

References

1960 births
Living people
New Patriotic Party politicians
Women members of the Parliament of Ghana
Ghanaian MPs 2013–2017
21st-century Ghanaian women politicians